Girl from God's Country is a 1940 American drama film directed by Sidney Salkow and written by Malcolm Stuart Boylan, Robert Lee Johnson and Elizabeth Meehan. The film stars Chester Morris, Jane Wyatt, Charles Bickford, Ray Mala, Kate Drain Lawson and John Bleifer. The film was released on July 30, 1940, by Republic Pictures.

Plot

Cast 
Chester Morris as Jim Holden aka Dr. Gary Currier
Jane Wyatt as Anne Webster
Charles Bickford as Bill Bogler
Ray Mala as Joe
Kate Drain Lawson as Koda
John Bleifer as Ninimook
Mamo Clark as Mrs. Bearfat Tillicoot
Ferike Boros as Mrs. Broken Thumb
Don Zelaya as Tom Broken Thumb
Clem Bevans as Ben
Edward Gargan as Poker Player
Spencer Charters as Dealer
Thomas E. Jackson as Poker Player
Victor Potel as Barber
Si Jenks as Trapper
Gene Morgan as Man at the dock

References

External links
 

1940 films
1940s English-language films
American drama films
1940 drama films
Republic Pictures films
Films directed by Sidney Salkow
Films scored by William Lava
American black-and-white films
1940s American films